Roy C. Start High School is the largest comprehensive public high school in Toledo, Ohio, United States.  The school opened in 1962 and is part of the Toledo Public Schools. It was named after Roy C. Start, two-time mayor of Toledo and founder of the West Toledo YMCA. The school building was demolished and replaced with a new building. Students have been attending the new Start since January 2008.  The only part of the original Roy C. Start High School building in use is the auditorium (which is now in the West Toledo YMCA building) and is attached to the new building.

Start Football
Start's football team appeared in the first OHSAA playoffs Division I in school history after finishing the regular season 9-1 during the 2015 season.  In 2016, after finishing 5-5 (0-5 out of conference ) Start won back to back city championships, a first in school history.

Rivalries
From its opening until 1991, Start had a rivalry with the DeVilbiss Tigers, which were located in the same neighborhood and a very short distance south of Start.  When DeVilbiss closed, much of its school district was absorbed by Start after a community effort urging TPS to merge Start into DeVilbiss had failed.

Start's main and long-standing rivals is Washington Local Schools’ Whitmer Panthers, located just over two miles away on Clegg Drive.  The "Battle of Tremainsville" was a non-conference matchup from Start's inception in the early 1960s until Whitmer joined the City League in 2003.  Beginning with the 2011-12 school year, it reverted to a non-league matchup when Whitmer joined the new Three Rivers Athletic Conference.

Clubs and organizations
Roy C. Start has a large number of clubs. Some of those clubs are:
 Russian Club - many students have competed and received medals by competing in the National Russian Essay Competition and the Ohio Spoken Olympiada.
 Red Cross Club
 Youth 2 Youth
 Z Club
 German Club
 SBG
 DECA
 Latin Club - functions as a local chapter of both the Ohio Junior Classical League (OJCL) and National Junior Classical League (NJCL).
 Mu Alpha Theta
 NHS
 Newspaper
 Art Club
 GSA
 Science Olympiad

Notable alumni
Scott Shriner (1983): bass guitarist, Weezer
Devin Vargas (2000): boxer, 2004 Olympics, 2000 & 2001 National Golden Gloves Heavyweight Champion

Ohio High School Athletic Association State Championships

 Baseball - 1994 (Easton National Champions), 2000
 Girls Track and Field – 1980

Toledo City League Titles

Bowling: 2012
Football: 1978, 2015, 2016, 2020
Volleyball: 1976, 1977, & 2015
Boys Cross Country: 2012
Girls Cross Country: 2011
Boys Basketball: 1978-79, 1996–97, 2012-2013
Girls Basketball: 2010-11
Boys Track and Field: 1991
Boys Track and Field: 2013, 2015–16
Girls Track and Field: 1973, 1974, 1975
Boys Soccer: 2016
Girls Softball: 2018-present
(years marked with an asterisk (*) denote a shared title)

References

External links
Toledo Public Schools
Start Spartan Football Site
Start Tech Club site

High schools in Toledo, Ohio
Public high schools in Ohio